Grimm is a surname. Notable people with the surname include:

 Alexander Grimm (born 1986), German slalom canoeist
 Brothers Grimm, German linguists
 Jacob Grimm (1785–1863), German philologist, jurist and mythologist
 Wilhelm Grimm (1786–1859), German author, the younger of the Brothers Grimm
 Carl Hugo Grimm (1890-1978), American composer
 Charlie Grimm (1898–1983), American baseball player and manager
 Christi Grimm, American acting Inspector General of the Department of Health and Human Services
 Christopher Grimm, American writer, director, and actor
 Christopher Grimm (politician) (1828-1895), American businessman and politician
 Cindy Grimm, American computer scientist, roboticist, and mechanical engineer
 Constantin de Grimm (1845–1896), Russian-born artist
 Georg Grimm (1846–1887) was a German painter, designer and decorator
 George Grimm (1859-1945), American politician and judge
 George Grimm (Presbyterian minister) (1833–1897) Presbyterian minister in New South Wales, Australia
 Hans Grimm (1875-1959), extreme right-wing German writer
 Justin Grimm (born 1988), American baseball player
 MF Grimm (born 1970), American musician and comic book writer
 Marco Grimm (born 1972), German football player
 Michael Grimm (politician) (born 1970), New York politician
 Robert Grimm (1881–1958),  Swiss socialist politician
 Rudolf Grimm (born 1961), experimental physicist from Austria
 Russ Grimm (born 1959), American football player
 Samuel Hieronymus Grimm (1733–1794), Swiss artist
 Warren Grimm (1888–1919), victim of the Centralia Massacre
 Wendelin Grimm (1818–1890), American farmer
 Friedrich Melchior, Baron von Grimm (1723–1807), German-born French author

Fictional characters
 Benjamin Grimm, fictional superhero known as The Thing, from the Fantastic Four.

See also
 Grimm (disambiguation)

Surnames from nicknames
Surnames from given names